Francisco Miguel Franco Antunes Gomes (born 2 June 1988), commonly known as Chico, is a Portuguese professional footballer who plays as a right back.

Club career
Born in Torres Vedras, Lisbon District, Chico spent five of his formative years at Sporting CP, then competed in the third division until the age of 23, in representation of four clubs. He first appeared in the Segunda Liga in the 2011–12 season with Moreirense FC, starting in all of his league appearances to help the team return to the Primeira Liga after a seven-year absence.

On 15 July 2013, after a further campaign in division two, with Portimonense SC, Chico signed a contract with Bulgarian club PSFC Chernomorets Burgas after a successful one-week trial. His first top-flight match occurred four days later, when he played the full 90 minutes in a 1–0 home win against PFC Cherno More Varna for the First Professional Football League.

Subsequently, Chico returned to his country's second tier, representing in quick succession C.F. União, C.D. Aves and C.D. Cova da Piedade. In late September 2017 the 29-year-old moved abroad again, joining Czech First League side FC Zbrojovka Brno as a free agent.

References

External links

1988 births
Living people
People from Torres Vedras
Portuguese footballers
Association football defenders
Liga Portugal 2 players
Segunda Divisão players
G.D. Tourizense players
FC Pampilhosa players
S.C.U. Torreense players
Moreirense F.C. players
Portimonense S.C. players
C.F. União players
C.D. Aves players
C.D. Cova da Piedade players
Amora F.C. players
First Professional Football League (Bulgaria) players
PFC Chernomorets Burgas players
Czech First League players
FC Zbrojovka Brno players
Portuguese expatriate footballers
Expatriate footballers in Bulgaria
Expatriate footballers in the Czech Republic
Portuguese expatriate sportspeople in Bulgaria
Sportspeople from Lisbon District